The Benalla Botanic Gardens, is a heritage listed botanic garden located in Benalla, Victoria, Australia. The gardens, originally designed by  Alfred Sangwell in 1886, was listed on the Register of the National Estate in 1995. The gardens include a rose garden established in 1959, which is the focus of the annual Benalla Rose Festival.
 Amongst the extensive mature tree collection are 3 specimens of Ulmus x viminalis which are the only specimens of this particular elm cultivar in Australia and are listed on the National Trust of Australia's significant tree register.

References

Botanical gardens in Victoria (Australia)
1886 establishments in Australia
Victorian places listed on the defunct Register of the National Estate
Victorian Heritage Register
Victorian Heritage Register Hume (region)
Rural City of Benalla